Charles of Hesse-Wanfried (born: 19 July 1649 at Rheinfels Castle; died: 3 March 1711 in Schwalbach), was a Landgrave of Hesse-Wanfried.  He was the second son of Landgrave Ernest of Hesse-Rheinfels and Maria Eleonore of Solms-Lich.

Life 
After an inheritance dispute about the "Rotenburg Quarter", Charles received Hesse-Eschwege in 1667.  He moved to Wanfried and founded the Catholic line of Hesse-Wanfried.  He used the castle in Wanfried as his residence, because the castle in Eschwege had been pledged to Brunswick-Bevern, also in 1667.

Marriages 
Charles's first wife was Countess Sophie Magdalene of Salm-Reifferscheid, a daughter of Count Eric Adolph of Salm-Reifferscheid and his wife Princess Magdalene of Hesse-Cassel. Sophie Magdalene died in 1675 during a trip to Venice.  Charles then married Alexandrine Juliane, a daughter of Count Emich XIII of Leiningen and Countess Dorothea of Waldeck. Alexandrine Juliane was the widow of Landgrave George III of Hesse-Itter-Vöhl.  She died on 19 April 1703 and was buried in the family vault in the Hülfensberg in Wanfried.

Death and heir 
Charles died in 1711 and was succeeded as Landgrave of Hesse-Wanfried by his son William II.  After William's death in 1731, he was succeeded by his half-brother Christian, who died childless in 1755, thereby ending the Hessen-Wanfried line.

Issue 
From his marriage to Sophie Magdalene:
 Charles Ernest Adolph (born: 8 October 1669, died: December 1669)
 Anna Maria Eleonora (born: 13 October 1670; died: January 1671)
 William II "the Younger" (born: 25 August 1671 in Langenschwalbach; died: 1 April 1731 in Paris, and buried there), Landgrave of Hesse-Wanfried-Rheinfels
 Frederick (born: 17 May 1673; died: 25 October 1692), a canon at Cologne, died during a visit to the Bishop of Győr in Hungary
 Philip (born: June 1674; died: 28 August 1694)

From his marriage to Alexandrine Juliane:
 Charlotte Amalie (born: March 8, 1679 at Wanfried, died: 8 February 1722 in Paris), married on 26 September 1694 in Cologne with Francis II Rákóczi (born: 27 March 1676; died: April 8, 1735), Prince of Transylvania
 Ernest (born: 20 April 1680 in Wanfried, died: June 24, 1680 ibid), buried in the Hülfensberg
 Sophia Leopoldine (born: 17 July 1681, died: 18 April 1724 in Wetzlar). Her daughter Maria Franziska of Hohenlohe-Bartenstein married Sophia's brother Christian.
 Charles Alexander (born: 6 November 1683 in Wanfried, died: February 1684 in Boppard)
 Maria Anna Johanna (born: 8 January 1685 in Wanfried, died: 11 June 1764 in Erfurt)
 Maria Therese Josepha Elisabeth (born: 5 April 1687, died: 9 September 1689)
 Christine Franziska Polyxene (born: 23 May 1688, died: 17 July 1728), married on 28 February 1712 with Dominic Marquard, Prince of Löwenstein-Wertheim-Rochefort
 Christian (born: 17 July 1689 in Wanfried, died: 21 October 1755 in Eschwege), the last Landgrave of Hesse-Wanfried-Eschwege and Hesse-Rheinfels
 Juliana Elizabeth Anna Louise (born: 20 October 1690 in Wanfried; died: 13 July 1724), married on 6 January 1718 in Wanfried with Count Christian Otto of Limburg-Styrum (born: 25 March 1694; died: 24 February 1749)
 Maria (born: 31 August 1693)
 Eleanor Bernhardine (born: 21 February 1695; died: 14 August 1768 in Frankfurt), married in June 1717 with Count Herman Frederick of Bentheim-Bentheim

References 
Chronik der Stadt Wanfried, Reinhold Strauß, 1908
Eckhart G. Franz, Das Haus Hessen, Stuttgart, 2005, 

Landgraves of Hesse
House of Hesse
1649 births
1711 deaths
17th-century German people